Hot R&B/Hip-Hop Songs is a chart published by Billboard that ranks the top-performing songs in the United States in African-American-oriented musical genres; the chart has undergone various name changes since its launch in 1958 to reflect the evolution of such genres.  In 1988, the chart was published under the title Hot Black Singles.  During the year, 35 different singles topped the chart, based on playlists submitted by radio stations and surveys of retail sales outlets.

In the issue of Billboard dated January 2, Michael Jackson was at number one three times with "The Way You Make Me Feel", retaining the spot from the final issue of 1987.  He also spent time atop the chart in 1988 with "Man in the Mirror" and "Another Part of Me", making him the artist with the most number ones during the year and taking the total number of Black Singles chart-toppers from his 1987 album Bad to five.  His total of five weeks spent in the peak position in 1988 was also the most of any act.  Pebbles, Al B. Sure!, Bobby Brown, and Freddie Jackson all topped the chart twice during the year.

During the year, Keith Sweat, Pebbles, Morris Day, Terence Trent D'Arby, Teena Marie, E.U., Al B. Sure!, Johnny Kemp, Tony! Toni! Toné!, George Michael, Sade, the Mac Band featuring the McCampbell Brothers, Jeffrey Osborne, Karyn White, Anita Baker, Cheryl Pepsii Riley, the Boys, and Ziggy Marley and the Melody Makers all reached number one for the first time, as did rapper Roxanne Shante when she featured on a chart-topper by Rick James.  Osborne had reached number one three times with his band L.T.D. during the previous decade, but "She's on the Left" became his first and only solo single to top the chart when it reached number one in September.  Sweat's "I Want Her" was ranked the overall best-charting Black single of the year by Billboard.  "Tumblin' Down" by Marley and the Melody Makers was the year's final number one.  Michael Jackson's "The Way You Make Me Feel" and "Man in the Mirror" also topped Billboards pop chart, the Hot 100, as did "Wishing Well" by D'Arby, "Get Outta My Dreams, Get into My Car" by Billy Ocean, and "One More Try" by Michael.

Chart history

See also
1988 in music
List of number-one R&B hits (United States)
List of number-one R&B albums of 1988 (U.S.)

References

Works cited

1988
1988 record charts
1988 in American music